2012 is the second EP by Canadian pop punk band Chixdiggit. It was released by Fat Wreck Chords on September 16, 2016. The album only consists of one track, which contains 19 songs, each one about a city the band had a show in during their 2012 tour. The single track challenges the NOFX claim to have recorded the longest punk song.


Track listing 
 "2012" - 24:23

Personnel

Band 
 Tyler Pickering – drums
 Jimmy Gamble – rhythm guitar
 KJ Jansen – vocals, bass, rhythm guitar

Additional musicians 
 Brendan Tincher, Keeje, Mike Eggermont – backing vocals
 Brent Cooper – guitar
 Kepi Ghoulie – vocals

References 

2016 EPs
Chixdiggit albums
Fat Wreck Chords EPs